Nahrab-e Deh Rash (also Romanized as Nahrāb-e Deh Rash; also known as Deh Rash and Deh Rash-e Nahrāb) is a village in Bazan Rural District, in the Central District of Javanrud County, Kermanshah Province, Iran. At the 2006 census, its population was 260, in 57 families.

References 

Populated places in Javanrud County